MaryAnne Sapio is a Washington DC lobbyist, and former beauty pageant titleholder.
Sapio won the Miss California title in 1999, and competed in the nationally televised Miss America 2000 pageant.
 She did not place in the competition, but did win the Bert Parks Non-Finalist Talent Award.

Sapio served as Director of Federal Affairs at Wheat Government Relations.  Her husband, Jeffrey Groharing, is a lawyer and an officer in the United States Marine Corps. Groharing is one of the officers appointed to prosecute Guantanamo captives charged before the Guantanamo military commissions.

Subsequently, Sapio held a number of senior positions, in Washington, at organizations advocating positions connected with health care, including: the American Academy of Nurse Practitioners (AANP); the American Health Care Association (AHCA); and the American Association of Colleges of Nursing.  Sapio was hired as the AANP's Vice President of Federal Government Affairs.

References

Living people
Miss America 2000 delegates
1978 births